The following lists some of the larger power stations in Indonesia. Data are not included for a large number of small isolated plants (mostly diesel) in the Outer Islands. In total, the PLN operated over 5,000 plants across Indonesia in 2010 of which over 4,500 were small diesel plants outside of Java. For further details about existing capacity and operations of the electricity sector, see information about the state-owned Indonesian electricity company Perusahaan Listrik Negara.

Non-renewable

Thermal
Thermal power is the largest source of power in Indonesia. There are different types of thermal power plants based on the fuel used to generate the steam such as coal, gas, diesel etc. About 85% of electricity consumed in Indonesia is generated by thermal power plants.

Bituminous coal or lignite

Existing
Note: IPP means independent power producer

Proposed or under construction

Gas or liquid fuel

Renewable

Geothermal 

Note: IPP means independent power producer

Hydroelectric 

Note: IPP means independent power producer

Pumped-storage hydroelectric
Currently under construction or planned:

See also

Energy in Indonesia
List of largest power stations in the world

References
 Large Scale Hydropower Plants in Indonesia by Indonesia Hydro Consult (http://www.arcgis.com/apps/OnePane/basicviewer/index.html?appid=65ed8bc862bd4af09c375d49f9d389d4)
 Small Scale Hydropower Plants in Indonesia by Indonesia Hydro Consult (http://www.arcgis.com/apps/OnePane/basicviewer/index.html?appid=2dffb753a63142b0bf7075389414daae)

 
Indonesia
Power stations
Electric power in Indonesia